Noah Akwu (born 23 September 1990 in Enugu) is a Nigerian track and field sprinter. At the 2012 Summer Olympics, he competed in the Men's 200 metres. He was the bronze medallist over that distance at the 2012 African Championships in Athletics. He was a relay silver medallist at the 2014 African Championships in Athletics and represented his country at the 2014 Commonwealth Games that year.

References

External links

1990 births
Living people
Nigerian male sprinters
Olympic athletes of Nigeria
Athletes (track and field) at the 2012 Summer Olympics
Commonwealth Games competitors for Nigeria
Athletes (track and field) at the 2014 Commonwealth Games
Sportspeople from Enugu